The 2020–21 season is Arsenal Women's Football Club's 35rd season of competitive football. The club participates in the Women's Super League, the FA Cup and the League Cup and will in addition to that compete in the 2019–20 FA Cup and the 2019–20 Champions League, which could not be completed in the previous season due to the COVID-19 pandemic.

Squad statistics
Statistics as of 16 May 2021

Appearances and goals

Goalscorers

Disciplinary record

Clean sheets

Transfers, loans and other signings

Transfers in

Contract extensions

Transfers out

Loans out

Current injuries

Suspensions

Pre-season

Competitions

Women's Super League

Matches

League table

Results summary

Results by matchday

FA Cup 

As a member of the top two tiers, Arsenal entered the FA Cup in the fourth round.

League Cup

Personal Awards

Arsenal Women Player of the Season 
 First place: Katie McCabe
 Second place: Vivianne Miedema
 Third place: Leah Williamson

References

External links
 Official website

Arsenal W.F.C. seasons
Arsenal